Chauranga is a 2016 Hindi film. It is the debut feature film of Indian writer-director Bikas Ranjan Mishra, produced by Onir and Sanjay Suri. The film was developed at the Screenwriters' Lab organized by National Film Development Corporation of India in collaboration with Locarno Film Festival and the ScriptStation of Berlinale Talent Campus, a part of Berlin International Film Festival.                       The Film won Golden Gateway of India Award for Best Film (India Gold 2014) at the 16th Mumbai Film Festival.

The film was  released worldwide on 8 January 2016.

Plot
This is based on Dalit-Brahmin relations in the villages tells how Dalits are exploited.
A fourteen-year-old Dalit boy (Soham Maitra) is growing up in an unnamed corner of India. His dream is to go to a town school like his elder brother (Riddhi Sen) and his reality is to look after the pig that his family owns. His only escape is to sit atop a Jamun tree and adore his beloved (Ena Saha) passing by on her scooter. His unspoken love is as true as his mother’s helplessness who cleans the cowsheds of the local Brahmin's mansion, with whom she also has a secret liaison. When the boy’s elder brother comes on a vacation to the village, he soon finds out about his younger brother’s infatuation. The learned elder brother makes him realize the need to express his love and helps him write a love letter.

Cast
Soham Maitra as Santu
Ena Saha as Mona
Riddhi Sen as Bajrangi
Sanjay Suri as Dhaval
Tannishtha Chatterjee as Dhaniya
Dhritiman Chatterjee as Lali Pandey, the blind priest
Swatilekha Sengupta as Dhaval's mother
Arpita Chatterjee as Nidhi
Anshuman Jha as Raghu
Delzad Hiwale as Shambhu

Development
Bikas Mishra's script was selected by the National Film Development Corporation in 2010 for its Screenwriters' Lab organized at Locarno Film Festival. The script was later selected by Berlinale Talent Campus' ScriptStation program. Marten Rabarts, the artistic director of Amsterdam-based Binger FilmLab consulted Bikas on the script at both the labs.

Awards

Grand Jury Prize for Best Film at 13th Indian Film Festival Of Los Angeles 2015 (IFFLA) 
 Golden Gateway of India for Best Film (India Gold) at 16th Mumbai Film Festival 2014 
 Chauranga won "Incredible India" Award for the best project of co-production market, at the NFDC Film Bazaar, International Film Festival of India, Goa 2011 and Script Funding from Goteborg International Film Festival, Sweden.

References

External links
 
 

2014 films
2010s Hindi-language films
Films shot in India
Films about the caste system in India
Indian avant-garde and experimental films
2010s avant-garde and experimental films